Acacetin is a 4′-O-methylated flavone of the parent compound apigenin, found in Robinia pseudoacacia (black locust), Turnera diffusa (damiana), shows moderate aromatase inhibition,  Betula pendula (silver birch), and in the fern Asplenium normale.

In plant synthesis the enzyme apigenin 4′-O-methyltransferase uses S-adenosyl methionine and 5,7,4′-trihydroxyflavone (apigenin) to produce S-adenosylhomocysteine and 4′-methoxy-5,7-dihydroxyflavone (acacetin).

See also 
 Genkwanin (methoxylated apigenin)
 Thevetiaflavone (methoxylated apigenin)

References 

Aromatase inhibitors
O-methylated flavones